Roszkowski (feminine: Roszkowska; plural: Roszkowscy) is a Polish noble surname. It may refer to:

People 
 Eliza Roszkowska Öberg (born 1978), Swedish politician
 Ireneusz Roszkowski (1910–1996), Polish obstetrician and gynaecologist
 Małgorzata Roszkowska (born 1967), Polish judoka
 Stanley Julian Roszkowski (1923–2014), American judge
 Wojciech Roszkowski (born 1947), Polish historian
 Patricia J Roszkowski  (born 1984) American Artist

See also

 Roszkowski family

 
 

Polish-language surnames